Spynie Canal is a canal in Moray, Scotland, which lies between Elgin and Lossiemouth. It drains into the River Lossie near its mouth at Lossiemouth.

History
Spynie Canal was created as the culmination of attempts to drain Loch Spynie (which survives as a small loch) and the low-lying areas between Spynie Palace and Lossiemouth, the surplus water flowing through sluice gates at Lossiemouth. Thomas Telford was consulted in 1808 and the contractor for the work 1808–11 was a Mr Hughes, who had worked on the Caledonian Canal. The unprecedented floods of 1829 caused considerable damage and subsequently dykes were thrown up along the canal's banks.

See also
List of canals of the United Kingdom

References

Canals in Scotland
Works of Thomas Telford
Canals opened in 1811